Glenea venusta is a species of beetle in the family Cerambycidae. It was described by Félix Édouard Guérin-Méneville in 1831.

Subspecies
 Glenea venusta malaitai Breuning, 1978
 Glenea venusta venusta (Guérin-Méneville, 1831)

References

venusta
Beetles described in 1831